Wartha may refer to the following places:

Wartha (Königswartha), a part of Königswartha, Saxony, Germany
Wartha (Eisenach), a part of Eisenach, Thuringia, Germany
Wartha, the German name for Bardo, Lower Silesia, Poland